Complete Me is the debut studio album by English recording artist Frankmusik. It was released in the United Kingdom on 3 August 2009 by Island Records. A deluxe edition, released on the same day in both CD and digital formats, included a bonus CD titled "Re-Complete Me", containing the full album remixed and re-edited by Frankmusik himself into one continuous 38-minute DJ set. An acoustic version of the album titled Completely Me was released digitally on 6 December 2009. New versions of the songs were monthly released through the year 2022 as a new version album called Completed.

Track listing

(*) denotes additional producer

Notes
 "When You're Around" is an adaptation of "Golden Brown" by The Stranglers.
 "Vacant Heart" contains elements from "Madam Butterfly (Un bel dì vedremo)" by Malcolm McLaren.
 "Time Will Tell" contains elements from "Pump Up the Volume" by MARRS.

Completely Me
The acoustic version of the album, titled Completely Me, was released digitally on 6 December 2009 containing the same track listing as that of the standard album (except for "When You're Around"), but each song was re-recorded and stripped down. As such, the running time for each song differs from the original release.

Personnel

Complete Me 2009
 Frankmusik – vocals, producer, executive producer; additional producer (track 10)
 Beatriz Artola – engineer (track 4)
 Tom Beard – cover photography
 Tim Debney – mastering
 Richard Edgeler – mixing assistant (tracks 1, 2, 8, 11)
 Ash Howes – mixing (tracks 4, 5, 9)
 David Norland – producer (track 10); additional producer (track 4); executive producer

 Chris Paroz – mixing (track 12)
 Stuart Price – producer (tracks 2–9, 11, 13); mixing (tracks 3, 11, 13)
 Red Design – art direction, design, illustration
 Alberto Seveso – illustration
 Fraser T Smith – additional producer (track 4)
 Brio Taliaferro – additional programming (tracks 1, 2, 8)
 Mark Taylor – additional producer, mixing (tracks 6, 7)
 Adam Wakeman – additional piano (track 4)
 Jeremy Wheatley – additional producer, mixing (tracks 1, 2, 8)

Charts

Release history

Completed new album version

Background
A new version of the album reworked from scratch, titled Completed, was released in December 2022 under Turner's own label. With a song release each last day of the month from January till December. The track listing is slightly different from the Original Complete Me album, it includes a reworked version of Made Her Smile from Turner's 2007 EP Frankisum. An instrumental version of each track is included on the digital version.

Notes
 "When You're Around" is an adaptation of "Golden Brown" by The Stranglers. Both songs were reworked from scratch during the process of the album. The original Stanglers'song was released at the end of June performed by Turner on his Spotify and YouTube channel. It was one of the first bonus track.
 A new version of the hidden track "Olivia" was supposed to be produced but matter of time Turner did not make it.

References

2009 debut albums
Albums produced by Stuart Price
Frankmusik albums
Island Records albums
Albums produced by Mark Taylor (music producer)